Molecular Cancer Research is a monthly peer reviewed academic journal published by the American Association for Cancer Research.

Prior to September 2002 it was known as Cell Growth & Differentiation.

External links 
 
 Cell Growth & Differentiation

Oncology journals
Monthly journals
American Association for Cancer Research academic journals